Ma Zongqing (born 22 July 1975) is a Chinese basketball player. She competed in the women's tournament at the 1996 Summer Olympics.

References

1975 births
Living people
Chinese women's basketball players
Olympic basketball players of China
Basketball players at the 1996 Summer Olympics
Sportspeople from Heilongjiang
Asian Games medalists in basketball
Basketball players at the 1994 Asian Games
Basketball players at the 1998 Asian Games
Asian Games silver medalists for China
Asian Games bronze medalists for China
Medalists at the 1994 Asian Games
Medalists at the 1998 Asian Games
20th-century Chinese women